"I'll Take Care of Your Cares" is a song by Frankie Laine from his 1967 album I'll Take Care of Your Cares.

Charts

Yearly charts

References 

Frankie Laine songs